The 1967 AFC Youth Championship was held in Bangkok, Thailand.

Teams
The following teams entered the tournament:

 
 
 
 
 
 
 
 
 
 
 
 
 
  (host)

Group stage

Group A

Group B

Group C

Group D

Quarterfinals

Semifinals

Third place match

Final

External links
Results by RSSSF

AFC U-19 Championship
AFC
International association football competitions hosted by Thailand
1967 in Thai sport
1967 in Asian football
1967 in youth association football